Uncaria acida is a species of liana in the family Rubiaceae.

Subspecies 
The Catalogue of Life lists:
 U. acida var. acida - Indo-China to W. & C. Malesia 
 U. acida var. papuana -  Borneo, New Guinea

References

Flora of Indo-China
Flora of Malesia
acida